Crime of the Century is a 1946 American crime drama directed by Philip Ford.

Plot
Hank Rogers is released from prison after serving time for a minor crime. He arranges to meet his brother Jim, a newspaper reporter, in a bar, where Hank is distracted by attractive Audrey Brandon. His brother doesn't show up, and at Jim's apartment, Audrey drugs his drink, rendering Hank unconscious.

With his brother missing, Hank tracks him to the mansion of a wealthy industrialist, whose daughter Margaret Waldham eyes him suspiciously. Hank ultimately finds that the industrialist is dead, but being kept on ice by Margaret and her cronies, who also have made Jim their prisoner. Hank rescues his brother with Audrey's help, whereupon Jim jokingly invites him to meet again later at the same bar.

Cast
 Stephanie Bachelor as Audrey Brandon
 Martin Kosleck as Paul
 Michael Browne as Hank Rogers
 Ray Walker as Jim Rogers
 Betty Shaw as Margaret
 Paul Stanton as Andrew Madison
 Mary Currier as Agatha Waldham
 Tom London as Dr. Jackson
 Ray Walker as Jim Rogers
 Don Costello as Joe, Bartender
 Earle Hodgins as Eddie
 Garry Owen as Taxi Driver
 Charles Cane as Ed Harris
 Charles C. Wilson as Police Lieutenant (as Charles Wilson)
 Frances Morris as Nurse
 David Fresco as Hotel Clerk

References

External links 
 
 

1946 crime drama films
1946 films
American crime drama films
American black-and-white films
1940s American films
1940s English-language films